Madibaka is a village panchayat in the Indian state of Andhra Pradesh, Chittoor district, 26 km from the temple town of Tirupati and 19 km from Sri Kalahasti.

The main occupation is agriculture. 

Villages in Chittoor district